The Tower of Toga or Tower of Pietrabugno was a Genoese tower located in the commune of Ville-di-Pietrabugno on the east coast of Cap Corse on the Corsica. The ruins were demolished in the 20th century.

The tower was one of a series of defences constructed by the Republic of Genoa between 1530 and 1620 to stem the attacks by Barbary pirates.

See also
List of Genoese towers in Corsica

References

Towers in Corsica